Xosha Kai Roquemore (born December 11, 1984) is an American actress. She is best known for her roles as Jo Ann in Precious and Tamra in The Mindy Project.

Early life and education
Roquemore was born in 1984 in Los Angeles, and is named after the Xhosa people of South Africa. She started acting when she joined The Amazing Grace Conservatory, in ninth grade. After graduating from high school, she moved to New York City and graduated from the Tisch program at New York University.

Career
Roquemore starred in her first major film as Jo Ann in Precious. In 2013, she was cast in a recurring role on Kirstie, based on her work in the series pilot. Her role, however, was recast after she was added as a series regular to The Mindy Project after a three-episode guest star stint.

Personal life
Roquemore was in a relationship with actor Lakeith Stanfield in August 2015. In March 2017, the couple announced Roquemore's pregnancy.

Filmography

Film

Television

References

External links

1984 births
Living people
Actresses from New York City
Actresses from Los Angeles
21st-century American actresses
Tisch School of the Arts alumni
American television actresses
African-American actresses
American film actresses